Montferrand-du-Périgord (literally Montferrand of the Périgord) is a commune in the Dordogne department in Nouvelle-Aquitaine in southwestern France.

Population

The Church of St Christophe – 11th century
The Church of St Christophe is an original village church and is a remarkable survivor with original wall paintings. It is located inside the cemetery on the hill south of the settlement. Although it is unclear exactly when or why the community left this location, local legend has it that a terrible plague outbreak may have been to blame. Up until the Revolution in 1847, when the church down in the village was completed, it was still in use as the Commune church.

The bell tower dominates the site. The nave was once almost four times longer and higher than the remaining portion, reaching as far as the extant arched memorial (located on this site to reflect the original length). The traces of the original roof on the west of the wall tower can still be seen. Yet again, there is no documentation of what transpired to the nave or why it was cut off. The inside plaster paintings that were lost are a significant loss, but a rich cultural feast remains intact.

An external scratched drawing of a fish skeleton on the south wall is a prominent component of the 11th Century. The 12th Century saw the construction of the Romanesque arch that now encloses the nave, and the 13th Century saw the addition of the circular apses to the original design. The three windows in the middle of the chancel arch are original, while further window openings were built during this period.

Medieval wall paintings
The Universe is represented by the Moon and Sun, which are painted with human features and laid in a bed of stars on the ceiling in the remaining Romanesque vault of the nave. Christ is depicted perched on a throne above the Chancel, giving his blessing while being encircled by the traditional representations of the four Evangelists. A lion represents St Mark; St Matthew by a winged man; St John by an eagle; and St Luke by a bull painted in fiery red. The Annunciation—with the Angel Gabriel bending down before Mary—and St. Christopher, the patron saint of the church, carrying Jesus across a ford with his staff in full bloom—are depicted in the paintings in the left-hand bay. Triangular geometric figures underneath this image have unknown symbolism in modern times. The primary painting on the north wall is a 15th-century depiction of Hell, with Leviathan (the sea monster) consuming the damned and a woman astride a lion heading towards him (a symbol of lust). 
Only two of the twelve apostles are still visible in a large picture of the Last Supper that once covered the opposite (south) wall. 
There are numerous further, in-depth pictures, including one of St. Leonard freeing the prisoners.

See also
Communes of the Dordogne department

References

Communes of Dordogne